Jay Sae Jung Oh (born 1982) is a South Korean born, Seattle based designer who specializes in 3D furniture design. Her 3D printed work specializes in sustainability, environmentalism and functionality.

Biography 
Jay Sae Jung Oh was born in South Korea and received her Bachelor and Master's degree from Kookmin University in Seoul, South Korea. Oh received a Master's degree in 3D design from the Cranbook Academy of Art in Michigan. Jay Sae Jung Oh worked alongside Italian designer Gaetano Pesce. Jay Sae Jung Oh's most notable work includes a series of furniture under the name "savage" which is mostly composed of 3D printed cowhide leather, various discarded objects, jute, and discarded plastics. This series includes chairs, sofas, wall organizers, stools and planters. The Savage series has renditions that are in black. Oh's first "Savage Chair" served as her Cranbook Graduation project. “Savage Chair” has two renditions in the span of 9 years. The first rendition of the "Savage Chair" includes jute and mundane objects while the second rendition in 2021 follows the same formula with the addition of cowhide leather. The purpose of this furniture was meant to symbolize sustainability and finding value in debris. Various identifiable objects can be found embedded into the 3D design such as a bicycle, a guitar and a children's rocking horse. Oh was a visiting professor at the University of Illinois at Chicago teaching industrial design for graduate and undergraduate students. Oh is the founder and designer behind luxury pet brand Boo Oh.

Public recognition 
Jay Sae Jung Oh has been featured in Architectural Digest, Elle Decor, New York Times, Fast Company, Washington Post, and Vogue. Her work has been displayed in permanent exhibitions in the Carnegie Museum of Art, the San Francisco Museum of Modern Art, the Smithsonian Design Museum, and the Cranbrook Art Museum. Her furniture designs are displayed in the Salon 94 gallery in New York City. Her work was included in the exhibition Mirror Mirror: Reflections on Design at Chatsworth at Chatsworth House.

References

External links 
 

1982 births
Living people